William Joseph Sheehan (4 July 1892 – 1978) was an English footballer who made one professional appearance for Rochdale when they joined the Football League in 1921. He also played for Rochdale St Johns and Rochdale Civil Service.

References

1892 births
1978 deaths
Footballers from Rochdale
English footballers
Association football fullbacks
Rochdale A.F.C. players
English Football League players